The Grand Opera House is an opera house located at the corner of 8th and Iowa Streets in Dubuque, Iowa that was built in 1890.  It was listed on the National Register of Historic Places in 2002.

It was deemed important as a "national treasure".  The theatre has the largest of all stages ever in Dubuque, and is Dubuque's only surviving opera house.  It is architecturally important as an early Richardsonian Romanesque building in Dubuque and as a salient work of Chicago architect Willoughby James Edbrooke.  It is Edbrooke's only surviving opera house, and he used its design in his design portfolio that won him the position of Supervising Architect of the U.S. Treasury Department in 1891.  Its design is said to be "representative of Edbrooke's smooth exterior wall interpretation of the Richardsonian Romanesque style."  It is also historically important from its association with high-quality theatre in Dubuque during 1890-1928.  The theater has been preserved with great historic integrity and, in 2002, was being restored for continuing use in live stage entertainment.  Its history is extremely well documented.

In 2015 performance events at the theater marked its 125th anniversary.

History

Early years
The Grand Opera House was built in 1889 and 1890.  The Grand Opera House, Inc. was established by William Lester Bradley, Sr. and five other people in 1890 to operate this and other theaters in Dubuque.  The opera house would cost $65,000 to build.  At the time of its construction, the Grand Opera House was the largest theater to be built in Dubuque.  It had a seating capacity of 1,100 and a huge stage that measured  from front to back.  Initially the opera house was connected by a tunnel to a house next door in which people changed costumes.

Originally the opening night performance was scheduled to occur on August 15, 1890 until it was realized that August 15 was also the Holy Day of the Assumption of the Blessed Virgin Mary.  At that point opening night was rescheduled to August 14.  Approximately 800 people paid five dollars to view the Hess Opera Company production of Carmen - a French opera by Georges Bizet.

For the next 40 years there were over 2,600 live productions shown at the Grand.  Henry Fonda, Ethel Barrymore, George Cohan, Sarah Bernhard, and Lillian Russell were among the more famous people to have performed at the Grand.  A number of years later Fonda would fondly remember his time playing at the Grand, and expressed gratitude that the Grand was still present.  One of the most elaborate productions was that of Ben-Hur, which was complete with horses and chariots on stage.  The theater showed a profit for 22 out of its first 28 years; the six unprofitable years being the result of capital improvements.

Movies

In 1915 movies were shown at the Grand for the first time.  The $15,488 profit that first year was three times that of the Grand's traditional theater productions.  In 1928 the Grand had its last live performance for many years when a production of the Merry Wives of Windsor was performed at the Grand.  The Grand was then renovated in 1930 into a movie theater.  The second balcony and box seats were removed and the orchestra pit was covered over.  The semi-circular stage was straightened.  A big screen and new projector was added to the theater.

When the Grand was converted into a movie theater, most of the movie theaters were located in downtown Dubuque.  By 1972 it was the only surviving downtown movie theater when it was sold to Richard Davis of Des Moines.  In 1976 Davis sold the theater to the Dubinsky Brothers.  The Grand continued to show movies for several more years.

Return of Live Theater
By the closing years of the 20th century, the Barn Community Theater had purchased the vacant and much-deteriorated Grand Opera House.  This marked the end of the Grand's days as a movie theater.  In 1986 a production of "Tintypes" was shown at the theater.  This marked the first time in over 57 years that a live production was shown at the Grand.

In recent years the Grand Opera House has undergone a number of renovations.  This included the restoration of the original facade was accomplished by removing the marquee and metal siding that was placed over it in the 1960s.  The interior of the theater was renovated as well.

References

External links
Grand Opera House Website

Music venues completed in 1890
Buildings and structures in Dubuque, Iowa
Economy of Dubuque, Iowa
Opera houses in Iowa
Romanesque Revival architecture in Iowa
Theatres in Iowa
Theatres on the National Register of Historic Places in Iowa
National Register of Historic Places in Dubuque, Iowa
Tourist attractions in Dubuque, Iowa
Theatres completed in 1890
Opera houses on the National Register of Historic Places in Iowa